A list of Hong Kong films released in 2014:

See also
 2014 in Hong Kong

References

External links
 IMDB list of Hong Kong films 
 Hong Kong films of 2014 at HKcinemamagic.com

2014
Films
Hong Kong